Ramon Neto da Costa (16 February 1987 – 6 October 2018), better known as simply Ramon Costa, was a Brazilian professional football player who played as a striker. He played for Brasil de Farroupilha.

Career 
Ramon Costa began his career with Figueirense, left the club after two years and joined Romanian club FC Politehnica Iași which plays in the Liga I. He left the club because the coach didn't think he was "prepared enough".

Death 
Ramon Costa died on 6 October 2018 due to a sudden cardiac arrest. He was playing with some friends when he suddenly collapsed and was pronounced dead at the hospital.

References

External links

CBF 
zerozero.pt
Guardian Stats Centre

1987 births
2018 deaths
Sportspeople from Santa Catarina (state)
Brazilian footballers
Figueirense FC players
Grêmio Esportivo Juventus players
Association football forwards